Septa occidentalis is a species of predatory sea snail, a marine gastropod mollusk in the family Cymatiidae.

Distribution

Description 
The maximum recorded shell length is 40.2 mm.

Habitat 
Minimum recorded depth is 0 m. Maximum recorded depth is 128 m.

References

Cymatiidae
Gastropods described in 1877